The Newark-Pompton Turnpike (now known in portions of its former route as Pompton Avenue, Route 23, and Bloomfield Avenue), is a roadway in northern New Jersey that was originally a tolled turnpike. The roadway was first laid out in the mid-18th century and given its name in 1806.  As originally designed, it connected Newark with the area north and west of the Pompton River in what is now Riverdale.  Its south end is Broadway in Newark; its north end is the Paterson-Hamburg Turnpike.  As such, it was part of an alternate route between Newark and Paterson.

In 1917, the road was designated as part of New Jersey State Highway 8.  After the 1927 New Jersey State Highway renumbering, part of the road became Route 23, while another section became part of Route 9 (now County Route 506 or CR 506).

Charlie Barnet recorded the song Pompton Turnpike, which was written by Will Osborne and Dick Rogers, about the Meadowbrook, a swing era performance venue on Pompton Avenue in Cedar Grove, NJ. It is now a Macedonian Orthodox Church. The song was covered as a jazz/blues vocal version by Louis Jordan, the "King of the Jukebox" in the 1940s.

President Grover Cleveland was born in a small house in Caldwell on the turnpike, now Bloomfield Avenue, west of the Pompton Avenue intersection. The house exists today in its original condition as a tourist attraction. Cleveland's father's church stands a few tenths of a mile down Bloomfield Avenue from Cleveland's original home.

The road passes through the following New Jersey communities:

Newark: Bloomfield Avenue (CR 506 SPUR)
Belleville: Bloomfield Avenue (CR 506 SPUR)
Bloomfield: Bloomfield Avenue (CR 506 SPUR)
Glen Ridge: Bloomfield Avenue (CR 506 SPUR, CR 506)
Montclair: Bloomfield Avenue (CR 506)
Verona: Bloomfield Avenue (CR 506), Pompton Avenue (Route 23)
Cedar Grove: Pompton Avenue (Route 23)
Little Falls: Newark-Pompton Turnpike (Route 23)
Wayne: Old Turnpike Road (CR 703), Route 23, Newark-Pompton Turnpike (CR 683, CR 504)
Pequannock: Newark-Pompton Turnpike (CR 504, CR 660), Route 23
Riverdale: Route 23, Newark-Pompton Turnpike (CR 511 ALT)

To follow the road in Wayne, it is necessary to turn right onto Hobson Ave immediately after crossing the Passaic River from Little Falls, cross under a railroad trestle, and turn left onto Old Turnpike Road. Route 23 bypasses this short stretch of the old road, and it is impossible to return to Route 23 at the north end of this short stretch.

History

In 1806, Israel Crane, a prominent businessman closely associated with the development of Montclair and Bloomfield, obtained a charter on February 24, 1806  from the state to build the private road, in the name of the "Newark and Bloomfield Turnpike Company".

Israel Crane eventually became the sole owner of the stock, and the sole operator of this toll road known as the Newark-Pompton Turnpike, which opened with four toll gates at Newark, Montclair, Pine Brook, and Singac. Because of his exclusive control of the turnpike, he was given the title "King Crane." 

The "Newark and Bloomfield Turnpike" made the markets of Newark and New York accessible to the farms in the northern and western portions of New Jersey. With this improved transportation Bloomfield and Montclair became commercial centers, with taverns, wheelwrights, blacksmiths and wagon makers.

In 1870, the executors of Mr. Crane's estate sold the Turnpike to the Essex County Road Board. They widened, graded and macadamized the now public highway, and gave it the name of Bloomfield Avenue.

Between 1933 & 1935, the Newark-Pompton Turnpike was built into a four-lane undivided arterial to connect with U.S. Route 46 (US 46). This was the section north of US 46 in Wayne up to what is now the exit (Overpass) by the present NJ Transit Route 23 Park/Ride Lot. A new alignment of Route 23 then continued north, removing the state highway from the rest of the Newark-Pompton Turnpike (except for a short ½ mile stretch in Pompton Plains and Riverdale). The Highway continued on a new alignment north through Riverdale, Butler & Kinnelon, connecting to the Paterson-Hamburg Turnpike in what was once known as Smith's Mills in West Milford.

During the 1980s, Route 23 was upgraded from an outmoded arterial to a modern freeway with service roads.

Major intersections

See also

References

External links

A history of NJ Route 23
Pictures of the Newark-Pompton Turnpike Bypass
The Website of the Crane House museum

Pre-freeway turnpikes in the United States
Transportation in Morris County, New Jersey
Transportation in Passaic County, New Jersey
Roads in New Jersey
Transportation in Newark, New Jersey
Turnpikes in New Jersey